Clive Griffin is a British pop vocalist, best known for his hit duet, "When I Fall in Love" (US No. 23) with pop singer Celine Dion. 

Clive was discovered by producer/composer Richard Niles who got him a deal with Phonogram/Mercury Records. Produced by Niles, the first album, "Step By Step",  was composed of songs written by Niles and Griffin. The album sold 10,000 copies in his native UK in the late 1980s, and featured several singles, "Head Above Water", "Don't Make Me Wait", "The Way We Touch" and "Be There", which also featured James Ingram on backing vocals.

His second album Inside Out did not fare quite so well, with only "I'll Be Waiting" making any notable impact on the charts. Thus ended his recording contract with Phonogram. Picking up the pieces, in 1992 the singer embarked on a tour with Eric Clapton, before signing a US record deal with Sony Records and releasing a self-titled album in 1993.

His third album contained the Diane Warren compositions "Commitment of the Heart" (US No. 96) and "We Don't Know How to Say Goodbye".

The album proved to be his last, and aside from a guest vocal on the Preluxe track "You're the One for Me", Griffin has only surfaced vocally on session work for other musicians, most notably Take That ("Never Forget") and Kylie Minogue ("Your Disco Needs You").

As a child, Griffin provided the vocal for the Cadbury Fudge jingle, "A finger of fudge is just enough", written by Mike d'Abo.

Discography

Albums
Step By Step (1989)
Inside Out (1991) (ITA No. 45)
Clive Griffin (1993)

Singles

References

Year of birth missing (living people)
Place of birth missing (living people)
Living people
English male singers
English pop singers